DN1 is an important national road in Romania which links Bucharest with the northwestern part of the country and the border with Hungary via Borș. The main cities linked by DN1 are Bucharest, Ploiești, Brașov, Sibiu, Alba Iulia, Cluj-Napoca and Oradea.

On the Comarnic – Brașov section, traffic jams appear very often because of intense traffic volume going in the touristic region of Valea Prahovei (Prahova Valley) and the road narrowing to only two lanes.

The segment of DN1 that serves the area north of Bucharest was upgraded at the end of 2005. It now has three traffic lanes on each side and two new interchanges at the Henri Coandă Airport and the Otopeni bridge. Although it doesn't complete the motorway specifications, the DN1 road can be considered an expressway on certain segments. A modern CCTV system has also been installed on the section from Bucharest to Sinaia to prevent speeding and accidents. The section from Bucharest to Comarnic is an undivided dual carriageway.

See also
Roads in Romania
Transport in Romania

Ramifications 
DN1A
DN1B

References

External links

Gallery

Roads in Romania
Prahova Valley